Sidney Alexander "Sandy" Silver (born October 15, 1969) is a Canadian politician, who served as the ninth premier of Yukon from 2016 to 2023. He was first elected to the Yukon Legislative Assembly in the 2011 election, and was re-elected in 2016. He represents the electoral district of Klondike and previously served as Leader of the Yukon Liberal Party.

Political career

33rd Assembly

Silver was first elected on October 11, 2011, defeating incumbent Yukon Party Cabinet minister Steve Nordick in the rural Yukon riding of Klondike. It was the only gain for the Yukon Liberal Party that election, which saw its caucus reduced to two seats (Silver and Darius Elias) and its leader, Arthur Mitchell defeated.

As a member of the assembly, Sandy Silver sat on the Standing Committee on Public Accounts, the Standing Committee on Appointments to Major Government Board and Committees, and the Members’ Services Board. He also served on the Select Committee on Whistle-blower Protection and the Select Committee Regarding the Risks and Benefits of Hydraulic Fracturing.

On August 17, 2012, Silver became interim leader of the Yukon Liberal Party following the resignation of Darius Elias, who quit the Liberals to sit as an Independent and leaving Silver as the lone Liberal MLA in the legislative assembly. Elias would later cross the floor to sit with the governing Yukon Party.

Silver became the permanent leader of the Yukon Liberal Party by acclamation in February 2014.

34th Assembly

Silver led the Liberals to a majority government in the 2016 election, taking his party from his single seat in the legislature to 11 of 19. It was also the party's strongest-ever showing in rural Yukon, where the Liberals took four of eight seats. Silver himself won the most votes and the highest share of support than any other candidate on election night. His party had campaigned on a platform that advocated for economic diversification, environmental protection, and improving First Nations relations.

Silver and his Cabinet was sworn in on December 3, 2016. His seven-member cabinet consisted of four men and three women. Silver himself assumed the portfolios of Minister of Finance and Minister of the Executive Council Office, in addition to Premier. He is currently also a member of the Members' Services Board.

35th Assembly 
Silver led the Liberals into the 2021 territorial election. The party won 8 seats, an exact tie with the Yukon Party. The Liberals lost the popular vote overall to the Yukon Party. Silver was personally elected in the district of Klondike. Silver announced his intent to form a minority government despite the tie. On April 23, the Liberals were sworn in with a minority government. On April 28, the NDP announced that they had entered into a formal agreement with the Liberals.

On September 9, 2022, Silver announced his intention to resign as premier and party leader, staying on until the party elected a successor. He also announced he would not be running for re-election to his riding of Klondike in the next election. He was succeeded by Ranj Pillai.

Personal life

Originally from Antigonish, Nova Scotia, Silver has lived in Dawson City since 1998. Before his election to the Legislative Assembly, he was a high school math teacher at Robert Service School in Dawson. He holds degrees in math and psychology from St. Francis Xavier University and a Bachelor of Education from the University of Maine.

Electoral record

Yukon general election, 2016

|-

| Liberal
| Sandy Silver
| align="right"| 687
| align="right"| 59.1%
| align="right"| +10.3%
|-

|-

| NDP
| Jay Farr
| align="right"| 111
| align="right"| 9.5%
| align="right"| -4.0%
|-
! align=left colspan=3|Total
! align=right| 1,163
! align=right| 100.0%
! align=right| –
|}

Yukon general election, 2011

|-

| Liberal
| Sandy Silver
| align="right"| 530
| align="right"| 48.8%
| align="right"| +34.1%
|-

|-

| NDP
| Jorn Meir
| align="right"| 147
| align="right"| 13.5%
| align="right"| -19.6%
|-
! align=left colspan=3|Total
! align=right| 1,085
! align=right| 100.0%
! align=right| –
|}

References

Yukon Liberal Party MLAs
1969 births
Living people
Yukon Liberal Party leaders
People from Antigonish, Nova Scotia
People from Dawson City
St. Francis Xavier University alumni
University of Maine alumni
21st-century Canadian politicians
Premiers of Yukon
Members of the Executive Council of Yukon
Canadian schoolteachers